Tornike Grigalashvili (born 28 January 1993) is a Georgian football player, currently playing for Dila Gori.

Club career
Grigalashvili began his career in Zestafoni. He spent a single season in Germany as well, playing for Schwarz-Weiß Rehden.

International
Grigalashvili made his debut for the Georgia national football team on 25 January 2017 in a friendly against Jordan.

External links

References

1993 births
Living people
Footballers from Georgia (country)
Georgia (country) international footballers
Association football defenders
FC Zestafoni players
FC Dila Gori players
Erovnuli Liga players